Carseae or Karseai, or Careseae or Kareseai (Καρησέαι), also known as Karseis or Kerasai or Kerateis, was a town of ancient Mysia or of Lydia, cited by Polybius. King Attalus I, with some Galatae, made an incursion against this place, and he reached them after crossing the Lycus River; afterward he attacked Didymateiche. There is some probability that the place which is meant is the Caresus of Strabo; and there is nothing in the narrative of Polybius that is inconsistent with this supposition. This Lycus River is unknown.

Its site is unlocated.

References

Populated places in ancient Lydia
Populated places in ancient Mysia
Former populated places in Turkey
Lost ancient cities and towns